Elīza Spruntule (born 11 January 1993) is a Latvian footballer who plays as a defender for ÍBV in the Icelandic Úrvalsdeild kvenna and has appeared for the Latvia women's national team.

Career
Spruntule has been capped for the Latvia national team, appearing for the team during the 2019 FIFA Women's World Cup qualifying cycle.

References

External links
 
 
 
 

1993 births
Living people
Latvian women's footballers
Women's association football defenders
Latvia women's youth international footballers
Latvia women's international footballers